Jip, His Story is a 1996 children's book written by American novelist Katherine Paterson. Set in Vermont during the 1850s, it focuses on a 12-year-old orphan named Jip, who was abandoned as an infant and mistaken for a gypsy because of his skin color. Jip works at a poor farm where mentally ill residents are housed.  Jip discovers that he is the part-black child of an escaped slave, and that he has been claimed as the property of a slave-owning farmer.

Jip, His Story, won the 1997 Scott O'Dell Award for Historical Fiction. In 2005, the book was turned into a musical by Danny Duncan and Emily Klion and performed at The Marsh. This adaptation won the 2008 American Harmony Prize.

References

1996 American novels
 American children's novels
 American young adult novels
 Children's historical novels
 Novels set in Vermont
 Novels about orphans
 Dutton Children's Books books
 Novels set in the 1850s
1996 children's books